Aeromech Airlines was a small U.S. commuter air carrier founded in Clarksburg, West Virginia in 1951 as Aeromech.

History

Initially the company was an air taxi operation.  It changed its name to Aeromech in 1971. Embraer EMB 110 Bandeirante small twin-turboprop airliners were acquired in August 1981 and these were operated on local commuter services, including to Washington National Airport. 

Aeromech was merged into Wright Airlines in October 1983 and the Bandeirantes were then operated by Wright.

Fleet
Embraer EMB 110 Bandeirante
Beech 99
de Havilland Canada DHC-6 Twin Otter

See also 
 List of defunct airlines of the United States

References

Defunct airlines of the United States
Airlines established in 1951
Airlines disestablished in 1983
Clarksburg, West Virginia
1951 establishments in West Virginia